The A2 motorway (Autovía EX-A2) is a road in Extremadura connecting Miajadas and Don Benito-Villanueva de la Serena.

References

Autopistas and autovías in Spain